Zangabad or Zangiabad is a village in the Panjwayi District of Kandahar Province, Afghanistan.

Geography
Zangabad is 915 meters above sea level. An earthquake with a strength of four to five according to Richter occurs on average every 50 years. Periods of extreme drought are very common.

See also
Kandahar Province

References

Populated places in Kandahar Province
Panjwayi District